Dean Tavoularis (born May 18, 1932) is an American motion picture production designer whose work appeared in numerous box office hits such as The Godfather films, Apocalypse Now, The Brink's Job, One from the Heart, and Bonnie and Clyde.

Biography
Although born in Lowell, Massachusetts, to Greek immigrant parents, Tavoularis spent his entire childhood and teenage years in Los Angeles, in the shadow of the Hollywood studios. He studied architecture and painting at different art schools and landed a job at the Disney Studios first as an in-betweener in the animation department, and later as a storyboard artist. In 1967, Arthur Penn called him to take charge of the artistic direction of Bonnie and Clyde. Three years later, Penn called him once again to design Little Big Man. But it was working with Francis Ford Coppola in 1972 on The Godfather that set the creative tone of his career. The Godfather Part II and The Conversation, in 1974, consolidated their collaboration, and laid the way for what was to be their joint creative challenge: Apocalypse Now, the film for which Tavoularis created a nightmare jungle kingdom, inspired by Angkor Wat. It was also on the set of Apocalypse Now that he met his future wife, French actress Aurore Clément. (Clément's role was eventually edited out of the final cut of the film, and only restored in the Apocalypse Now Redux version in 2001.

From 1967 until 2001, he worked on over thirty movies and landed five Academy Award nominations for Best Art Direction, one of which he won for The Godfather Part II. For the 1982 release One from the Heart he recreated both the Las Vegas 'strip' and McCarran International Airport on the sound stages of Zoetrope Studios. The list of directors with whom he has worked includes: Michelangelo Antonioni (Zabriskie Point, 1970), Wim Wenders (Hammett, 1982), Warren Beatty (Bulworth, 1998) and Roman Polanski (The Ninth Gate, 1999).

External links

Dean Tavoularis Book

1932 births
Living people
Best Art Direction Academy Award winners
Best Production Design BAFTA Award winners
American people of Greek descent
Artists from Lowell, Massachusetts
American production designers
Film producers from California
People from Los Angeles
American storyboard artists
Film producers from Massachusetts